This is the list of municipalities in Hokkaido, Japan, sorted by subprefecture:

Okhotsk (formerly Abashiri) Subprefecture

Cities
 Abashiri (capital)
 Kitami
 Kitami (former)
 Tanno (from Tokoro District)
 Rubeshibe (from Tokoro District)
 Tokoro (from Tokoro District)
 Monbetsu

Towns and villages by district
Abashiri District
 Bihoro
 Ōzora
 Memanbetsu (from Abashiri District)
 Higashimokoto (from Abashiri District)
 Tsubetsu
Monbetsu District
 Engaru
 Engaru (former; from Monbetsu District)
 Ikutahara (from Monbetsu District)
 Maruseppu (from Monbetsu District)
 Shirataki (from Monbetsu District)
 Nishiokoppe
 Okoppe
 Ōmu
 Takinoue
 Yūbetsu
Shari District
 Kiyosato
 Koshimizu
 Shari
Tokoro District
 Kunneppu
 Oketo
 Saroma

Hidaka Subprefecture

Cities
There are no cities in this subprefecture.

Towns and villages by district
 Hidaka District
 Shinhidaka
 Mitsuishi (from Mitsuishi District)
 Shizunai (from Shizunai District)
 Horoizumi District
 Erimo
 Niikappu District
 Niikappu
 Samani District
 Samani
 Saru District
 Biratori
 Hidaka
 Hidaka (former; from Saru District)
 Monbetsu (from Saru District)
 Urakawa District
 Urakawa

Hiyama Subprefecture

Cities
There are no cities in this subprefecture.

Towns and villages by district
 Hiyama District
 Assabu
 Esashi (capital)
 Kaminokuni
 Kudō District
 Setana
 Setana (from Setana District)
 Kitahiyama (from Setana District)
 Taisei (from Kudō District)
 Nishi District
 Otobe
 Okushiri District
 Okushiri
 Setana District
 Imakane

Iburi Subprefecture

Cities
 Date
 Date (former)
 Ōtaki (from Usu District)
 Muroran (capital)
 Noboribetsu
 Tomakomai

Towns and villages by district
 Abuta (Iburi) District
 Tōyako
 Abuta (from Abuta District)
 Tōya (from Abuta District)
 Toyoura
 Shiraoi District
 Shiraoi
 Usu District
 Sōbetsu
 Yūfutsu (Iburi) District
 Abira
 Hayakita (from Yūfutsu District)
 Oiwake (from Yūfutsu District)
 Atsuma
 Mukawa
 Mukawa (former; from Yūfutsu District)
 Hobetsu (from Yūfutsu District)

Ishikari Subprefecture

Cities
 Chitose
 Ebetsu
 Eniwa
 Ishikari
 Ishikari
 Atsuta (from Atsuta District)
 Hamamasu (from Hamamasu District)
 Kitahiroshima
 Sapporo (capital of the prefecture and the subprefecture)

Towns and villages by district
 Ishikari District
 Shinshinotsu
 Tōbetsu

Kamikawa Subprefecture

Cities
 Asahikawa (capital)
 Furano
 Nayoro
 Nayoro
 Fūren (from Kamikawa (Teshio) District)
 Shibetsu
 Shibetsu
 Asahi (from Kamikawa (Teshio) District)

Towns and villages by district
 Kamikawa (Ishikari) District
 Aibetsu
 Biei
 Higashikagura
 Higashikawa
 Kamikawa
 Pippu
 Takasu
 Tōma
 Kamikawa (Teshio) District
 Kenbuchi
 Shimokawa
 Wassamu
 Nakagawa (Teshio) District
 Bifuka
 Nakagawa
 Otoineppu
 Sorachi (Kamikawa) District
 Kamifurano
 Minamifurano
 Nakafurano
 Yūfutsu (Kamikawa) District
 Shimukappu
 Uryū District
 Horokanai

Kushiro Subprefecture

Cities
 Kushiro (capital)
 Akan (from Akan District)
 Onbetsu (from Shiranuka District)

Towns and villages by district
 Akan District
 Tsurui
 Akkeshi District
 Akkeshi
 Hamanaka
 Kawakami District
 Shibecha
 Teshikaga
 Kushiro District
 Kushiro
 Shiranuka District
 Shiranuka

Nemuro Subprefecture

Cities
 Nemuro (capital)

Towns and villages by district
 Menashi District
 Rausu
 Notsuke District
 Betsukai
 Shibetsu District
 Nakashibetsu
 Shibetsu

Oshima Subprefecture

Cities
 Hakodate (capital)
 Hakodate (former)
 Minamikayabe (from Kayabe District)
 Esan (from Kameda District)
 Toi (from Kameda District)
 Todohokke (from Kameda District)
 Hokuto
 Kamiiso (from Kamiiso District)
 Ōno (from Kameda District)

Towns and villages by district
 Futami District
 Yakumo
 Yakumo (from Yamakoshi District)
 Kumaishi (from Nishi District, Hiyama)
 Kameda District
 Nanae
 Kamiiso District
 Kikonai
 Shiriuchi
 Kayabe District
 Mori
 Mori (former; from Kayabe District)
 Sawara (from Kayabe District)
 Shikabe
 Matsumae District
 Fukushima
 Matsumae
 Yamakoshi District
 Oshamanbe

Rumoi Subprefecture

Cities
 Rumoi (capital)

Towns and villages by district
 Mashike District
 Mashike
 Rumoi District
 Obira
 Teshio (Rumoi) District
 Enbetsu
 Horonobe
 Teshio
 Tomamae District
 Haboro
 Shosanbetsu
 Tomamae

Shiribeshi Subprefecture

Cities
 Otaru

Towns and villages by district
 Abuta (Shiribeshi) District
 Kimobetsu
 Kutchan (capital)
 Kyōgoku
 Makkari
 Niseko
 Rusutsu
 Furubira District
 Furubira
 Furuu District
 Kamoenai
 Tomari
 Iwanai District
 Iwanai
 Kyōwa
 Isoya District
 Rankoshi
 Shakotan District
 Shakotan
 Shimamaki District
 Shimamaki
 Suttsu District
 Kuromatsunai
 Suttsu
 Yoichi District
 Akaigawa
 Niki
 Yoichi

Sorachi Subprefecture

Cities
 Akabira
 Ashibetsu
 Bibai
 Fukagawa
 Iwamizawa (capital)
 Iwamizawa (former)
 Kurisawa (from Sorachi District)
 Kita (from Sorachi District)
 Mikasa
 Sunagawa
 Takikawa
 Utashinai
 Yūbari

Towns and villages by district
 Kabato District
 Shintotsukawa
 Tsukigata
 Urausu
 Sorachi District
 Kamisunagawa
 Naie
 Nanporo
 Uryū District
 Chippubetsu
 Hokuryū
 Moseushi
 Numata
 Uryū
 Yūbari District
 Kuriyama
 Naganuma
 Yuni

Sōya Subprefecture

Cities
 Wakkanai (capital)

Towns and villages by district
Esashi District
 Esashi
 Esashi (former; from Esashi District)
 Utanobori (from Esashi District)
 Hamatonbetsu
 Nakatonbetsu
Rebun District
 Rebun
Rishiri District
 Rishiri
 Rishirifuji
Sōya District
 Sarufutsu
Teshio (Sōya) District
 Toyotomi

Tokachi Subprefecture

Cities
 Obihiro (capital)

Towns and villages by district
 Ashoro District
 Ashoro
 Rikubetsu
 Hiroo District
 Hiroo
 Taiki
 Kamikawa (Tokachi) District
 Shimizu
 Shintoku
 Kasai District
 Memuro
 Nakasatsunai
 Sarabetsu
 Katō District
 Kamishihoro
 Otofuke
 Shihoro
 Shikaoi
 Nakagawa (Tokachi) District
 Honbetsu
 Ikeda
 Makubetsu
 Makubetsu (former; from Nakagawa (Tokachi) District)
 Chūrui (from Hiroo District)
 Toyokoro
 Tokachi District
 Urahoro

Geography of Hokkaido
Populated places in Hokkaido